Hai Zi (March 24, 1964 – March 26, 1989) is the pen name of the Chinese poet Zha Haisheng. He was one of the most famous poets in Mainland China after the Cultural Revolution. He committed suicide by lying on the rail in Shanhaiguan at the age of 25.

Biography
Zha Haisheng was born in an agricultural family of a small village in Anhui Province. He spent his childhood in traditional Chinese rural areas when the whole country was involved in the Cultural Revolution. In 1979, he was enrolled in Peking University at the age of 15. He began to write poems as a student in early 1980s. After graduation, he worked in China University of Political Science and Law. He kept sending his own poems written in an extremely dull environment of life to different newspapers and publishers but was hardly accepted. He remained unknown to common readers until his death.

Hai Zi was fascinated with Tibetan culture and Qigong in his last years. He ended his life by lying on the rail not far from Shanhaiguan near his 25th birthday. A bag with a Bible, a book of selected stories by Joseph Conrad, Walden by Henry David Thoreau, and Kon-Tiki by Thor Heyerdahl was found beside his body. His death is now regarded as an important event in modern Chinese literature with some suggesting it symbolizes "the sacrifice of the agricultural civilization". Not long after his death, most of his works were published by major publishers of China and were spread rapidly over the country.

Legacy

Hai Zi has become one of the most quoted poets after the New Culture Movement. His mystical life and death remain an important topic of Chinese literature and society. A cult of Hai Zi involves young people from all over China since the 1990s, though he is still not entirely accepted by older experts.

Hai Zi's poems have a strong influence on the popular culture in Mainland China. Some of his poems have been set to songs.

Hai Zi's poem Facing the Sea, with Spring Blossoms is inferred and mentioned several times in the Hong Kong movie McDull, Prince de la Bun.

Many coastal places of China are regarded as the one described in the poem Facing the Sea, with Spring Blossoms. But according to some research about the life of the poet, the beach of Xichong in Shenzhen is the most probable place.

Works
Hai Zi wrote several long poems, "choral operas" and countless short poems in his brief life. His style is generally described as "anachronism". Many of his short poems contain symbolic images like Land, Sea and Wheat field and recall the ideals of the ancient Chinese pastoral poet Tao Yuanming. Hai Zi was also obviously influenced by Western philosophy and arts, especially Nietzsche and Van Gogh. And the strong sense of mysticism in all of his works is probably one of the most important characteristics which turned him into a unique figure of Chinese literature.

Some of his poems have been translated into English. A bilingual book of his poems Over Autumn Rooftops, translated by Dan Murphy, was published in 2010 by Host Publications. A new bilingual book, Ripened Wheat: Selected Poems of Hai Zi, translated by Ye Chun, was out from the Bitter Oleander Press in 2015. In Italy, Del Vecchio Editore celebrated the 30th anniversary of Haizi’s death publishing, for the first time in Italian, a selection of 80 poems (“Un uomo felice“, 2019) translated by Francesco De Luca.

Short poems
Hai Zi's short poems are his most popular works. Some of them are now classics of 20th-century Chinese literature and are quoted frequently.

Asian Copper (《亚洲铜》)
The Sun of Arles (《阿尔的太阳》)
The Four Sisters (《四姐妹》)
To the Night (《黑夜的献诗》)
Facing the Sea, with Spring Blossoms (《面朝大海，春暖花开》)
Motherland, or Dream as a Horse (《祖国，或以梦为马》)
Spring, Ten Hai Zis (《春天，十个海子》)

Long poems and other works
Legend (《传说》)
The River (《河流》)
But Water, Water (《但是水、水》)
Messiah (《弥赛亚》)
Six Mysterious Stories (《神秘故事六篇》)

Selected Poems in translation 
 "Mute Back" tr. Ye Chun
 "Dunhuang"
 "Poetry Book"
 "Song: Light Strikes the Ground"
 "Wind Cup: A Bouquet of Love Poems"
 "Thinking of a Past Life"

Further reading
 ''Six poems], by Hai Zi (trans. by Ye Chun)
 Chinese Writers on Writing featuring Hai Zi. Ed. Arthur Sze. (Trinity University Press, 2010)
 Over Autumn Rooftops (A bilingual edition of Hai Zi's poetry published by Host Publications)[https://www.amazon.com/Ripened-Wheat-Selected-Poems-Hai/dp/0986204900/ref=sr_1_2?s=books&ie=UTF8&qid=1452850019&sr=1-2&keywords=hai+zi Ripened Wheat: Selected Poems of Hai Zi translated by Ye Chun (The Bitter Oleander Press, 2015)
 Un uomo felice'' translated by Francesco De Luca (Del Vecchio Editore, 2019) Italian-Chinese edition

See also

Chinese poetry
Misty Poets

References

1964 births
1989 suicides
Mystic poets
Misty poets
20th-century poets
Poets from Anhui
Suicides by train
Suicides in the People's Republic of China
People from Huaining County
Peking University alumni